Gwyneth Van Anden Walker (born 22 March 1947) is an American music educator and composer.

Biography
Walker was born in New York to a Quaker family and grew up in New Canaan, Connecticut. She began her first efforts at composition at an early age and went on to receive BA, MM and DMA degrees in Music Composition from Brown University and the Hartt School of Music, where she studied under Arnold Franchetti. She married composer David Burton on September 12, 1969; they divorced in 1974. She taught music for fourteen years at Hartt School of Music, the Hartford Conservatory and the Oberlin College Conservatory, and then moved to a dairy farm in Vermont and went to work as a full-time composer. In 1988, she helped found the Consortium of Vermont Composers and later became the director of the organization.

Awards
1999 Brock Commission (American Choral Directors Association)
2000 Lifetime Achievement Award (Vermont Arts Council)
2008 Athenaeum Award for Achievement in the Arts and Humanities (St. Johnsbury, Vermont, Athenaeum)
2012 Elected as a Fellow of the Vermont Academy of Arts and Sciences
2017 Composer in Residence with the Great Lakes Chamber Orchestra in Petoskey, Michigan

Works and discography
Walker's compositions include song cycles, jazz, folksongs and spirituals, rock-and-roll, choral music, traditional folk songs, ballads and cantatas.

Orchestral:
An American Concerto for Violin and Orchestra on the CD "from the Mid-Columbia
An American Concerto for Violin and Orchestra on the CD Paul Freeman Introduces... Siegmeister, Walker, Creston, Staar-Levy

Instrumental:
A Vision of Hills, Fantasy Etudes for violin and piano,
New World Dances for piano trio, Craftsbury Trio for piano trio, Touch the Sky for cello and piano, and Vigil for violin and piano on the CD A Vision of Hills
Fantasy Etudes for violin and piano on the CD Done e Doni
Five Pieces for Flute and Guitar on the CD Returning the Muse to Music
Five Pieces for Flute and Guitar and Silvermine Suite for flute and guitar on the CD Celestials
Four American Folk Songs on the CD Birds
Four Pieces for Lute on the CD The Renaissance Lute
Raise the Roof! for brass quintet on the CD Americana: A University of Iowa Celebration and Strophes of the Night and Dawn
Shaker Tunes for brass quintet on the CD Season to Dance
Theme and Variation for flute and piano on the CD Legacy of the American Woman Composer

Choral:
An Hour to Dance for SATB chorus and piano
Harlem Songs for SATB chorus and piano
Love -- By the Water for SATB chorus and piano
Three Days by the Sea for SATB chorus and piano
This Train for SATB chorus
God's Grandeur for SATB chorus on the CD An Hour to Dance
Now Let Us Sing! for SSA chorus, brass quintet, percussion, and piano
How Can I Keep From Singing? for SSA chorus, brass quintet, percussion, and piano
Peace, I Ask Of Thee O River for SSA chorus, brass quintet, percussion, and piano
Songs for Women's Voices for SSA chorus and piano
I Thank You God for SSA chorus and piano
Crossing the Bar for SSA chorus and piano
Hebrides Lullaby for SSA chorus
Let Evening Come for SSA chorus and piano
The Spirit of Women for SSA chorus
Gifts from the Sea for SSA chorus and piano on the CD Now Let Us Sing!
Come All Ye Fair and Tender Ladies and Shenendoah on the CD Sounds So Entrancing
The Christ-Child's Lullaby on the CD Christmas a cappella: Songs from around the World
Three American Portraits for String Quartet, The Golden Harp for Chorus and String Quartet, and White Horses for SATB Chorus and Piano, and Cheek to Cheek for SATB Chorus and Piano on the CD The Golden Harp
Hebrides Lullaby on the CD A Retro Christmas With CONCORA
Hebrides Lullaby on the CD Christmas in Our Time
How Can I Keep from Singing? on the CD Abbondanza! Abundant Joys
I Thank You God on the CD ACDA Raymond W. Brock Endowment, Commissioned Compositions, Volume I
I Thank You God on the CD Amazing Day, 20th Century Music for Women's Choir
My Girls on the CD Celestial Sirens Demo 2000
My Love Walks in Velvet on the CD Vox Femina Los Angeles -- 2000 LA Regional ACDA Convention
Rejoice! -- Christmas Songs on the CD Juletide 2001 -- Luther College
River Songs on the CD Sounds & Colors of Vermont
Songs for Women's Voices on the CD When I Sing
Mornings Innocent and In Autumn on the CD Taking Shape
Sounding Joy on the CD Sounding Joy
This Train on the CD 1998 All-OMEA Festival Concert

Vocal Works:
Song cycles though love be a day, Mornings Innocent, The Sun is Love, and solo piano Semplice and Rhythms from the North Country are on the CD "The Sun Is Love" performed by Michelle Areyzaga, soprano and Jamie Shaak, piano
Song cycles though love be a day, Songs of the Night Wind, No Ordinary Woman! and selected opera arias are on the CD Scattering Dark and Bright: Song Cycles and Arias by Gwyneth Walker
As A Branch in May and Weave No Cloak Against Tomorrow are on the CD Music Sweet as Love
Four American Folk Songs and Songs for Voice and Guitar on the CD Arise: Music of the Americas for Voice and Guitar
maggie and millie and mollie and may on the CD "Women's Voices"
No Ordinary Woman! on the CD "No Ordinary Woman!"though love be a day on the cassette "Music of Her Own"though love be a day on the CD "though love be a day"I Speak for the Earth on the CD "Donne e Doni Vol. II"

Keyboard Works:Cantos for the End of Summer on the CD Character SketchesEvensong from Cantos for the End of Summer for piano on the CD Piano Portraits of the SeasonsIn Celebration for organ on the CD "Women Composers for Organ"Rhythms from the North Country for piano on the cassette Alive and Well''

External links
Composer's website

References

1947 births
Living people
20th-century classical composers
American women classical composers
American classical composers
American music educators
American women music educators
People from New Canaan, Connecticut
University of Hartford Hartt School alumni
University of Hartford Hartt School faculty
Brown University alumni
Oberlin College faculty
20th-century American women musicians
20th-century American composers
20th-century women composers
American women academics
21st-century American women